Sushi Sushi is a French film, released on 19 June 1991 and directed by Laurent Perrin.

Synopsis
Fed up with university life, Maurice Hartmann leaves his studies and creates his own business: Sushi-Express, a Japanese food home delivery business. His artisanal methods and family craft drive the project towards bankruptcy. A businessman lends his hand to the business and delivers sushi using more industrial methods.

Technical details
 Title : Sushi Sushi
 Director : Laurent Perrin
 Writer : Michka Assayas, Jacques Fieschi, Laurent Perrin and Jérôme Tonnerre
 Production : 
 Production company : 
 Music : Jorge Arriagada
 Photography : Dominique Le Rigoleur
 Editing : 
 Decoration : Jacques Rouxel
 Country of origin : France
 Format : Colours - 1,85:1 - Dolby - 35 mm
 Genre : Comedy drama
 Length : 86 minutes
 Release date : 19 June 1991 (France)

Starring
 André Dussollier : Maurice Hartmann 
 Jean-François Stévenin : Richard Souriceau 
 Sandrine Dumas : Claire 
 Michel Aumont : Bertrand Casier 
 Kentaro Matsuo : Kiyoshi 
 Éva Darlan : Hélène 
 Frédéric Deban : Manu 
 Marie-Armelle Deguy : Magali 
 Marianne Epin : Suzanne 
 Jean-François Perrier : Pradère 
 Aladin Reibel : Parmentier 
 Pierre-Alain Chapuis : Vincent 
 Catherine Frot : La banquière 
 Pascal Aubier : Schlumpelmeyer 
 Olivier Broche
 Jacky Nercessian

External links
 

French comedy films
1991 films
1990s French films